Changi is a six-part Australian television miniseries broadcast by ABC TV in 2001. It originally aired from 14 October 2001 to 18 November 2001.

Overview
The series follows the trials and tribulations of six fictional Australian soldiers interned at the Changi prisoner of war camp in Singapore during World War II.

Changi is presented as a frame story, with six older war veterans reuniting in 1999 to share their experiences and memories of their time as young men at the camp. The series is also notable for featuring scenes of toilet humour and black comedy in an otherwise serious production, a deliberate inclusion on the part of writer John Doyle, better known for his comedic alter-ego Rampaging Roy Slaven.

Doyle originally envisaged the series as a sitcom with the working title of Worn Out & Weary and he first pitched the idea to the ABC as such. It was only later in the writing phase that he decided to switch to drama, albeit with elements of humour remaining as a prominent feature.

A total of 53 sets had to be built for the miniseries, standing in for the camp, parts of Singapore and the Malayan jungle. The series was shot in four locations and in studio sets around Sydney. The ABC invested AUD 6 million (USD ) on the production, a figure representing one-sixth of the ABC's annual drama budget.

Two cast members portraying the older versions of the main characters previously served in World War II. Bud Tingwell served as a fighter pilot while Slim DeGrey was actually imprisoned as a POW at the Changi camp after the fall of Singapore to the Japanese.

The series was directed by Kate Woods who, at the time, was best known for directing the successful Australian film Looking for Alibrandi (2000) and who, in more recent years, has become a successful television director in the United States.

Cast

 Old David- Charles 'Bud' Tingwell 
 Young David- Matthew Newton 
 Old Gordon- Frank Wilson 
 Young Gordon- Anthony Hayes 
 Old Bill- Terry Norris 
 Young Bill- Leon Ford 
 Old Curley- Slim DeGrey 
 Young Curley- Mark Priestley 
 Old Eddie- Bill Kerr 
 Young Eddie- Stephen Curry 
 Old Tom- Desmond Kelly
 Young Tom- Matthew Whittet
 Major Dr Rowdy Lawson- Geoff Morrell
 Lieutenant Aso- Tsushima Gotaro
 Colonel Nakamura- Misawa Shingo
 Old Kate- Jill Perryman
 Young Kate- Mary Docker
 Ken- John Howard
 Nerida- Sacha Horler
 Betty & Joanne- Katherine Slattery
 General Tanaka- Ken Senga
 Captain Shindo- Ishihara Tatsumi
 Dr Hurrell- Peter Carroll
 Old Vi- Marie Armstrong
 Young Vi- Rebecca Murphy
 Todd- Simon Maiden
 Lisa- Nadine Garner
 Old Joyce- Judi Farr
 Young Joyce- Eliza Logan
 Bertie Jenkins- Joel McIlroy

Episodes
1999. Six ageing former POWs who spent three and a half years in Changi are each preparing for the reunion of 'The Secret 9', the name of the close-knit group of six POWs whose mutual support and friendship sustained them throughout their experiences in the camp.

Since the end of the war, the group have held reunions every nine years and this upcoming one will most likely be their last. As the date of the reunion draws near, each of the veterans find his memories ignited by a sight or sound associated with their traumatic experiences.

Reception
The series Changi was a ratings success. The final episode, which aired on ABC-TV on Sunday evening on 18 November 2001, was the second-most watched show that night in Australia.

Reviews for the series were mixed. Robin Oliver, writing in The Sydney Morning Herald, declared the series to be "immensely satisfying" and Robert Fidgeon, in Melbourne's Herald Sun, wrote that it was "one of the finest pieces of drama ever produced (in Australia)" Michael Fitzgerald, writing in Time, said that the series, despite some flaws, was "the finest, most thoughtful local drama since Australia's miniseries heyday in the 1980s... The series isn't about the history of Changi, it's about the idea of Changi and how it refracts through the years to become something repressed, mythologised and feared.... Most movingly, it's about the transfer of memory to the next generation."

Christopher Bantick, writing in Brisbane's Courier Mail, was scathing in his review about the series. He said that the series "is a long way from representing fairly or in a balanced way what went on in the notorious camp and is close to being a profligate waste of public money". Bantick referred to Changi as "sick" and a "bomb" that "deserves to fail." Stephen Garton, writing in 2002 in the Journal of Australian Studies, believed the series to be a missed opportunity. In his view, Changi portrayed "an enfeebled narrative of the POW experience – narrow, parochial, inward-looking, blind to the complexities of former prisoner's voices but attuned to a nostalgic vision... of the Anzac Legend."

Controversy and criticism
The series Changi attracted considerable controversy when it first aired in 2001 and drew both praise and criticism from military historians, media commentators and real-life former POWs.

Peter Stanley, principal historian at the Australian War Memorial 1987–2007, was highly critical of the series: "It gives viewers a misleading and unrealistic idea of the POW experience and of their captors. The danger is that people either believe what they see on television or don't know what's wrong and right." According to Stanley, the series contained a number of historical inaccuracies.

 The massacre of POWs that occurs in the final episode never happened in the real Changi.
 POWs are depicted as saluting Japanese officers whereas in reality, they were required to bow. Also, the real-life Changi in-mates had to endure frequent roll-calls ('Tenko') which do not occur in the TV version.
 In the series, POWs and Japanese guards mingle frequently but in reality, the prisoners and the Japanese kept apart and rarely saw each other, the POWs having to run the camp themselves.
 In the series, the POWs mock their captors in a camp concert but according to Stanley, that could never have happened as 'Japanese guards were very conscious of preserving their dignity. In real POW camps, prisoners dared not make fun of Japanese guards. It just simply wouldn't have happened.'
 The camp is portrayed in the series as quite small, housing only a few hundred prisoners but the real Changi was much larger, being a permanent or temporary home to many thousands of Allied POWs.

A number of real-life former in-mates of Changi were interviewed for their opinions on the series and the responses varied greatly. Some ex-POWs declared the series to be a moving, accurate portrayal whilst others dismissed it as unrealistic, overly sanitised, inaccurate and guilty of failing to depict the hardships of the real camp.
'Half of its rubbish!', declared one former POW.

Historian Michael Cathcart praised the series, calling it 'a moving series that captured the suffering and comradeship that were at the heart of the prisoner of war experience...and a celebration of the powerful egalitarian spirit that is the Australian story'

John Doyle defended his work. 'It's a series that runs the risk of offending everyone and satisfying no one'. Doyle argued that the series 'was not history but art – an effort to be honest to the spirit not the facts of Changi. When you try to deal with such a tricky subject, you have to abandon naturalism.' Doyle claimed that he wanted the series to show how 'Australian humour and mateship allowed Australians to survive in greater numbers than other groups of prisoners.'

Awards
The production won the Logie Award for the Most Outstanding Mini Series/Telemovie in 2002. Actors Geoff Morrell, Matthew Newton and Bud Tingwell were also nominated for Most Outstanding Actor Logies, and the mini series also received 3 AFI Award nominations.

See also 
 King Rat (Clavell novel), set in Changi

References

External links
 ABC Changi website
 

Changi
Australian Broadcasting Corporation original programming
2000s Australian television miniseries
Australian military television series
World War II television drama series
2001 Australian television series debuts
2001 Australian television series endings